Lily Ho is a Chinese actress from Hong Kong. Ho is known for playing leading heroines in Shaw Brothers films. Ho is known for the 1966 The Knight Of Knights and her role as Ainu, a lesbian, in Intimate Confessions of a Chinese Courtesan, a 1972 Adult Martial Arts film.

Early life 
On November 25, 1946, Ho was born in Nanjing, China. Ho grew up in Taiwan. Ho graduated from The Girl's Middle School in Taiwan.

Career 
At age 16, Ho began her acting career in Taiwan. 1963, Ho was discovered by Yuan Chiu-feng, a director who cast her for Songfest in Taiwan. In 1965, Ho became a Shaw Brothers actress in Hong Kong. Ho is known for 1966 The Knight Of Knights, where she appeared partially nude. Ho played a male role in 1972 in The Fourteen Amazons. Ho also is known for her role as Ainu, a lesbian, in Intimate Confessions of a Chinese Courtesan, a 1972 Adult Martial Arts film directed by Chor Yuen. Ho is known as one of the 12 Golden Hairpins.

Filmography

Films 
 1963 (1964, 1965) Song Fest (aka Songfest) - Ying Hua.
 1965 Song of Orchid Island - Bai Da-Na 
 1956 The Monkey Goes West  - Skeleton Demon
 1966 Till the End of Time - Huang I-Hua 
 1966 The Knight of Knights - Lin Hong Yu 
 1966 Auntie Lan 
 1966 Princess Iron Fan
 1967 Angel With The Iron Fists - Luo Na, Ai Si, Agent 009.
 1967 Hong Kong Nocturne -  Chia Tsui Tsui  
 1967 The Sword and the Lute
 1967 Inter-Pol
 1967 That Tender Age
 1967 My Dreamboat - Tang Ke Shin.
 1967 King Drummer 
 1968 The Silver Fox 
 1968 Angel Strikes Again 
 1968 The Brain-Stealers
 1968 Hong Kong Rhapsody - Herself 
 1969 The Singing Thief 
 1969 The Millionaire Chase 
 1969 Tropical Interlude 
 1970 The Golden Knight
 1970 The Orchid 
 1970 A Time for Love 
 1971 The Venus' Tear Diamond 
 1971 The Jade Faced Assassin 
 1971 The Lady Professional 
 1971 We Love Millionaires 
 1971 Lady with a Sword - Feng Fei Fei.
 1972 The Water Margin
 1972 The Casino - Miss Cui 
 1972 Trilogy of Swordsmanship
 1972 Of Wives and Mistresses
 1972 Intimate Confessions of a Chinese Courtesan - Ainu 
 1972 The 14 Amazons - Yang Wen Kuan
 1972 The Warlord
 1972 Flower in the Rain
 1973 Facets of Love
 1973 River of Fury 
 1973 The House of 72 Tenants 
 1974 Sex, Love and Hate 
 1974 Five Tough Guys
 1975 All Men Are Brothers
 1983 The Lost Generation

Awards 
 1973 Outstanding Lead Female Performance Award for The 14 Amazons. Asian Film Festival.

Personal life 
In 1972, Ho married George Chao Tse Kwong (died 2016), a Hong Kong shipping tycoon and youngest son in a prominent Hong Kong family.  They had four children. Eldest daughter Sabrina Chao is currently President of Baltic and International Maritime Council. Ho's brother-in-law is Cecil Chao.

References

External links 
 Lily Ho at imdb.com
 Lily Ho at allmovie.com
 Lily Ho Li-Li at hkmdb.com
 Lily Ho Lei-Lei at lovehkfilm.com

Hong Kong film actresses
Living people
1946 births